Les Sables-d'Olonne station is a railway station serving the town Les Sables-d'Olonne, Vendée department, western France. The station is served by high speed trains to Paris and by regional trains towards La Roche-sur-Yon and Nantes.

References

External links
 

Railway stations in Vendée